Shwe Pon is a Burmese politician and medical doctor who currently serving as the Deputy Minister for the Ministry of Health appointed by the National Unity Government of Myanmar.
 

She was born on 24 February 1951. She is a member of the National League for Democracy. She has served as the NLD Bago Township Executive Committee since 1988, Member of Central Committee, NLD (Bago Region) 2012 till date, Member of Central Women Working Committee (NL D) and Vice president of National Health Network (NLD). In the 2015 Myanmar general election and 2020 Myanmar general election , she  was elected as a Pyithu Hluttaw MP and elected representative from Bago Township parliamentary constituency.

References

Members of Pyithu Hluttaw
National League for Democracy politicians
1951 births
Living people
People from Bago Region